The Majithia family, are a family of Sher-Gill Jat sardars (chiefs) that originate from the region of Majitha in the Punjab. The family is divided into three principle branches, the Dayal Singh branch, Surat Singh branch, and Mahtab Singh branch. Dayal Singh and Matab Singh were fifth cousins, whilst Surat Singh was considerably more distantly related to them. One had to go back fourteen generations from their generation to find a common relation between Surat Singh and the other two branches. An early ancestor of the family was Madho, a Jat of the Gill clan, which the Sher-Gill clan is a derivative of. He founded the village of Madho-Jetha, later known as Majitha. Lepel H. Griffin in his work, Panjab Chiefs (1865), states that the Majithia family is the progeny of a certain Rana Dhar, who was the son of Sher-Gil (founder of the clan).

Notable Members

Dayal Singh branch 
Lehna Singh (d. 1854)
Ranjodh Singh (d. 1872)
Dyal Singh (1848–1898)

Surat Singh branch 
Surat Singh (1810–1881)
Sundar Singh (1872–1941)
Surjit Singh (1912–1995)
Amrita Sher-Gil (1913–1941, through her father, Umrao Singh Sher-Gil)

Mahtab Singh branch 

Mahtab Singh (1811–1865)

Pedigrees

References

Indian families
People from Amritsar